Ejercito is a family name from the Philippines:
Joseph Estrada - Born as Jose M. Ejercito, is an actor and the former president of the Philippines.
Loi Ejercito - Real name Luisa Pimentel-Ejercito, is the wife of former president Joseph Estrada and the former First Lady of the Philippines.
Jinggoy Estrada - Born as Jose P. Ejercito Jr., is an actor and former senator of the Philippines.
JV Ejercito - Former senator of the Philippines.
George Estregan - Born as Jesus Jorge M. Ejercito, an actor
E. R. Ejercito - also known by the screen names "Jorge Estregan" and "George Estregan Jr.", is an actor and former politician.
Gary Estrada - Real name Gary Jason B. Ejercito, an actor
Gherome Ejercito - Basketball player